Lophospiridae is an extinct taxonomic family of sea snails, marine gastropod molluscs.

This family has no subfamilies.

Genera 
Lophospiridae contains the following genera:

References